Mont-Laurier Airport  is located  west of Mont-Laurier, Quebec, Canada.

References

External links
 Page about this aerodrome on COPA's Places to Fly airport directory

Registered aerodromes in Laurentides
Mont-Laurier